KNOP-TV (channel 2) is a television station in North Platte, Nebraska, United States, affiliated with NBC. It is owned by Gray Television alongside two low-power stations: CBS affiliate KNPL-LD (channel 10) and Class A Fox affiliate KIIT-CD (channel 11). The three stations share studios on South Dewey Street in downtown North Platte; master control and some internal operations are based at the facilities of sister station KOLN on North 40th Street in Lincoln. KNOP-TV's transmitter is located at the site of its former studio on US Route 83 north of North Platte.

KNEP (channel 4) in Scottsbluff, Nebraska, operates as a semi-satellite of KNOP-TV.

History
KNOP-TV was founded by local investors headed by attorney Rush Clarke and went on-air December 15, 1958.

In 1968, it was purchased by Richard F. Shively, Harold O. Shively and Ulysses Carlini Sr. Richard died on December 4, 2003. In 1997, Shively and Carlini bought KHAS-TV in Hastings, and formed Greater Nebraska Television as a holding company for their television interests.

In 2005, Greater Nebraska Television sold its stations (including KNOP-TV) to Hoak Media.

KNOP started rebroadcasting NBC programming in high definition, and carrying K11TW's Fox programming on its second digital subchannel, in March 2011.

KNOP gained national attention in February 2012 for being the only station in the country to air a Will Ferrell-produced Super Bowl commercial for Old Milwaukee beer.

On November 20, 2013, Hoak announced the sale of most of its stations, including KNOP-TV and K11TW, to Gray Television. The sale made them sister stations to North Platte CBS affiliate KNPL-LD, a semi-satellite of Gray's KOLN/KGIN; it would have also partially separated KNOP from KHAS-TV, which was planned to be sold to Excalibur Broadcasting but be operated by Gray's KOLN/KGIN and KSNB-TV through a shared services agreement. However, in the wake of heightened FCC scrutiny about local marketing agreements, on June 11, 2014, KHAS-TV announced it would leave the air at midnight on June 13 and NBC programming would be moved to KSNB-TV and the digital subcarrier of KOLN/KGIN. The whole sale was completed on June 13. (KHAS was ultimately sold to Legacy Broadcasting, the call letters were changed to KNHL, and it returned to the air in June 2015 as a SonLife Broadcasting Network affiliate.

On September 14, 2015, Gray announced that it would purchase the television and radio stations owned by Schurz Communications, including Scottsbluff, Nebraska based KDUH-TV (a satellite of Rapid City's ABC-affiliated KOTA-TV) for $442.5 million. Gray planned to convert KDUH into a semi-satellite of KNOP-TV, change the station's call letters to KNEP, and also change KDUH/KNEP's city of license to Sidney, Nebraska (which will move it from the Cheyenne–Scottsbluff market to the Denver market, eliminating an ownership conflict with KSTF, a Gray-owned, Scottsbluff-based semi-satellite of Cheyenne, Wyoming-based CBS affiliate KGWN-TV). The sale approved by the FCC on February 12, 2016, and was completed on February 16. The FCC approved the change of station's city of license on May 16. KNEP's NBC feed for the Nebraska Panhandle (which is branded as "NBC Nebraska Scottsbluff" and produces its own newscasts) signed on May 5, 2016. The station formerly aired KOTA-TV programming on its DT1 channel until 2020.

Newscasts
KNOP-TV presently broadcasts 17 hours of locally produced newscasts each week (with three hours each weekday and one hour each on Saturdays and Sundays). The station also produces 2½ hours of weekly news programming each for CBS and Fox affiliated sister stations KIIT-CD and KNPL-LD. Between the three stations, the news operation produces about 22 hours of news programming each week.

Technical information

Subchannels
The station's digital signal is multiplexed:

Analog-to-digital conversion
KNOP-TV shut down its analog signal, over VHF channel 2, on February 10, 2009. The station's digital signal relocated from its pre-transition UHF channel 22 to VHF channel 2 for post-transition operations.

References

External links

Television channels and stations established in 1958
1958 establishments in Nebraska
NBC network affiliates
Circle (TV network) affiliates
Gray Television
NOP-TV